Laura Damgaard Lund (born 16 September 1996) is a Danish handballer for Viborg HK and the Danish national team.

She made her debut on the Danish national team on 26 November 2020, against Norway.

She represented Denmark at the 2020 European Women's Handball Championship.

Achievements 
Danish Championship:
Bronze Medalist: 2020

Individual awards
 Top scorer of the Regular season: 2019
 All-Star Best player of the Danish 1st Division: 2017/18

References

1996 births
Living people
People from Lolland
Danish female handball players
Viborg HK players